The UC Irvine Anteaters men's volleyball team is the men's intercollegiate volleyball team at the University of California, Irvine. UC Irvine was a founding member of the Mountain Pacific Sports Federation in the 1992–93 season. Beginning with the 2017–18 season, UCI moved to the Big West Conference's inaugural men's volleyball league. Irvine has won the NCAA Men's National Collegiate Volleyball Championship four times, and appeared in the tournament an additional three.

Roster

R – redshirt

Notable alumni
The following alumni are distinguished for their contribution to the school's men's volleyball program and for having a successful  playing career individually.
 Kévin Tillie, 2011–13
 Carson Clark, 2009–12
 Ryan Ammerman, 2006–09
 Jayson Jablonsky, 2004–07
 David Smith, 2004–07
 Brian Thornton, 2004–07

References

External links